Esmatabad (also Romanized as ‘Eşmatābād) is a village in Eshaqabad Rural District, Zeberkhan District, Nishapur County, Razavi Khorasan Province, Iran. At the 2006 census, its population was 587, in 141 families.

References 

Populated places in Nishapur County